Tedia is a genus of Asian woodlouse hunting spiders that was first described by Eugène Simon in 1882.  it contains only two species: T. abdominalis and T. oxygnatha.

References

Araneomorphae genera
Dysderidae
Spiders of Asia
Taxa named by Eugène Simon